Welcome Strangers is the second studio album by Scottish chamber pop band Modern Studies, released on 18 May 2018 by Fire Records.

Critical reception

Welcome Strangers was met with universal acclaim reviews from critics. At Metacritic, which assigns a weighted average rating out of 100 to reviews from mainstream publications, this release received an average score of 86, based on 6 reviews.

Track listing

References

External links
 

2018 albums
Fire Records (UK) albums